Lechuza (Spanish "barn owl") may refer to:

La Lechuza, barn owl in Mexican and Texano folk tales
El Lechuza, a village in Juan Martín de Pueyrredón Department, Argentina
Lechuza, or Lechuza Caracas, Venezuelan polo club
Lechuza (album), by band Fenix TX 2001
La Lechuza, album by Esmerine 2011 
La Tia Lechuza, play by Isabel Cheix 1896
Lechuza, self-watering planter brand of Brandstätter Group
Lechuza Blanca, character in Isabelle Allende's Zorro